Riscylla Walsh Shaw (b 1972) is a Canadian Suffragan Bishop.

Education

Shaw was educated at the University of Toronto and ordained in 2001.

Career
 Youth Minister, St. Mary, Richmond Hill 
 Assistant Curate, King City 2000-2002
 Incumbent, Minden-Kinmount 2003-2009
 Incumbent, Christ Church Bolton 2009-2016

Becomes bishop

Shaw was elected on 17 September 2016, and consecrated on January 7, 2017. She is responsible for 57 parishes in the Trent-Durham section of the Toronto diocese.

External links
 Installation as Bishop

References 

1972 births
Living people
People from Ontario
University of Toronto alumni
Anglican bishops of Toronto
21st-century Anglican Church of Canada bishops